Genay is the name of the following communes in France:

 Genay, Côte-d'Or, in the Côte-d'Or department
 Genay, Rhône, in the Rhône department